Dolors Lamarca y Morell (Granollers, Vallès Oriental, 19 October 1943) is a Catalan librarian and philologist. She has led the Service of Libraries and Bibliographic Heritage of the Generalitat de Catalunya, and has directed the National Library of Catalonia.Widow of Antoni Comas i Pujol, with whom she had three daughters.

Biography 
Lamarca studied Classical Philology at the University of Barcelona, and library science at the School of Bibliology. On November 5, 1974, she joined the faculty of Archivers, Librarians and Archaeologists (Library Section) at the University of Barcelona..

She led the "Library and Bibliographic Heritage Service" of the Generalitat de Catalunya from August 1, 1980 until March 2, 1983. During these years she established the foundations of the current Catalan library system, adapting cataloging regulations through the Catalan Institute of Bibliography and opening new libraries to provide more service to the public.  Later, she was director of the Library of the University of Barcelona (1984-2000),  achieving important milestones at the head of this network of libraries, such as the modernization of structures and buildings, adding full computerization.

On February 12, 2004, she became director of the National Library of Catalonia., a position she held until June 2012.   During these seven years she managed a fund of great bibliographic and documentary value made up of more than three million documents in different types of media. In an era where the information society is so important, the Library launched different digitization projects of its heritage fund to allow heritage diffusion at a global level for the Library of Catalonia, and of everything that is published in Catalonia, thus preserving all of its contents at the same time. Under the motto "open, reliable and useful", she modernized the BC by purchasing new equipment, improving internal processes. Under his direction, numerous musical, literary or graphic heritage funds were acquired.

Selected works

References 

Spanish librarians
Spanish women librarians
1943 births
People from Granollers
Spanish philologists
Women philologists
Women writers from Catalonia
Spanish non-fiction writers
University of Barcelona alumni
Academic staff of the University of Barcelona
Living people